Shrivelling is a natural phenomenon where an object, with an attached sub-elastic covering, has its interior volume reduced in some way. The covering, which cannot contract any further, is then obliged to wrinkle and buckle, in order to preserve surface area while containing the lesser volume.

Foods
For example, in raisin production manufacturers shrivel grapes by drying (desiccating) them.

See also

 List of dried foods
Food drying

References

External links
 
 

Dried foods
Cooking techniques